The Presbyterian Church of Australia (PCA) is the largest Presbyterian denomination in Australia. (The larger Uniting Church in Australia incorporated about two-thirds of the PCA in 1977.)

History

Beginnings 

When captain James Cook landed in Australia in 1776 he was sure to have had some Presbyterians in his crew. John Hunter the captain of HMS Sirius was a former Church of Scotland minister.
Later Presbyterian Christianity came to Australia with the arrival of members from a number of Presbyterian denominations in Great Britain at the end of the 18th century.
The Presbyterian missionaries played an important role to spread the faith in Australia. Since then Presbyterianism grew to the fourth largest Christian faith in the country.

The Presbyterian Church of Australia was formed when Presbyterian churches from various Australian states federated in 1901. The churches that formed the Presbyterian Church of Australia were the Presbyterian Churches of New South Wales, Victoria, Queensland, South Australia, Tasmania and Western Australia. These state churches were (and still are) incorporated by separate Acts of Parliament (i.e. by the respective State Parliaments) for property holding purposes. (These Acts are known as Property Trust Acts).

Church union 

In 1977 two-thirds of the Presbyterian Church of Australia together with nearly all the membership of the Congregational Union of Australia and the Methodist Church of Australasia, joined to form the Uniting Church in Australia. Much of the third who did not join the Uniting Church did not agree with its liberal views, although a number remained because of cultural connections.

After the union 
Before the union the Presbyterian Church of Australia was liberal, but the continuing Presbyterian Church became increasingly conservative. A resurgence of traditional Reformed theology took place. In 1982 the denomination withdrew from the largely liberal World Communion of Reformed Churches and later joined the conservative World Reformed Fellowship. In 1987 a new hymnbook was introduced. In 1991 the General Assembly of the Presbyterian Church in Australia repealed the approval of the ordination of women. Women elders continue in some states. The heresy trial of Peter Cameron in 1993 upheld historic Reformed beliefs. The church is active in missions with about 130 missionaries working around the world, including Korea, the Pacific and Myanmar.

Statistics 
The Presbyterian Church of Australia's official website has stated that the church has over 50,000 adults and children within 740 congregations with more than 600 ministers, deaconesses and theological students.

At the last Commonwealth Census (2016) nearly 540,000 people identified as Presbyterian/Reformed, representing 2.3% of the population. This makes Presbyterianism Australia's fifth largest Christian denomination, although not all Presbyterians are members of the Presbyterian Church of Australia. See also List of Presbyterian Denominations in Australia.

Church organisations

The Presbyterian Church of Australia's missionary organisation is the Australia Presbyterian World Mission. The organisation has more than 170 cross-cultural missionaries.

The Presbyterian Church of Australia has established Arabic, Chinese, Cook Islands, Indonesian, Japanese, Korean, Samoan and Sudanese congregations, as well as a deaf Presbyterian Church.

The Presbyterian Inland Mission continues the work of the Australian Inland Mission founded by John Flynn in 1912. Padres patrol outback Queensland, New South Wales, South Australia and Western Australia, and hopes to expand into the Northern Territory and Tasmania when resources become available.

The Presbyterian Church of Australia publishes the monthly Australian Presbyterian magazine and provides social and educational services.

Schools
The following schools have links with or are run by the Presbyterian Church of Australia. The closeness and formality of association varies.

Australian Capital Territory
Covenant College, Tuggeranong

New South Wales
Cooerwull Academy, Lithgow (now closed)
Presbyterian Ladies' College, Armidale
Presbyterian Ladies' College, Sydney, Croydon
Pymble Ladies' College (formerly; now administered by the Uniting Church in Australia)
The Scots College, Sydney
The Scots School, Bathurst
St Andrew's Christian School, Grafton
Nambucca Valley Christian Community School, Nambucca Heads

Queensland
Fairholme College, Toowoomba
The following schools in Queensland are conducted by the Presbyterian and Methodist Schools Association.
Brisbane Boys' College, Toowong
Clayfield College, Clayfield
Somerville House, South Brisbane
Sunshine Coast Grammar School, Sunshine Coast

Victoria
Belgrave Heights Christian School, Belgrave Heights
King's College, Warrnambool
Presbyterian Ladies' College, Melbourne
St Andrew's Christian College, Wantirna
Scotch College, Melbourne

Theological colleges
The PCA currently has three colleges, based in Australia's three largest cities: the Queensland Theological College in Brisbane, Christ College in Sydney and the Presbyterian Theological College in Melbourne. Trinity Theological College, Perth, though independent, is also recognised as a theological training institution.

Bookshops
The Presbyterian Church operates the Reformers Bookshop in Sydney (as a joint venture with Stanmore Baptist Church) and the PTC Media Centre – part of the Presbyterian Theological College in Melbourne.

Beliefs

Ministers and elders of the Presbyterian Church of Australia are required to agree to the Westminster Confession of Faith as their subordinate authority under the Bible.

Interchurch organisations 
The Presbyterian Church of Australia belong to the World Reformed Fellowship, which is a conservative association, where Reformed, Presbyterian, Reformed Baptist and Reformed Episcopal denominations, congregations and individuals can also participate.

Church government

The Presbyterian Church of Australia is ruled by elders or presbyters. Presbyterian churches recognise two types of elders: teaching elders (ministers) and ruling elders.  These elders meet at a local level in the Kirk Session.  Only ordained ministers may preside at Communion, or the Lord's Supper, except in the rare circumstance where the presbytery licenses a ruling elder to do so.  Likewise, only a minister can administer Baptism.  A board or committee of management handles the material concerns of the local congregation. Deacons may also be elected to provide practical care.

The minister and an elder from each parish have a seat at their regional presbytery and at their state's general assembly.  The General Assembly of Australia (GA of A), composed of commissioners from each presbytery and state assembly, meets every three years. Every year each state's general assembly elects a moderator, while the General Assembly of Australia elects a moderator general for a three-year term.

In 1991, the PCA's General Assembly of Australia determined that only men are "eligible for admission to the Ministry of Word and Sacraments." The rights of women ordained prior to this time were not affected.

Australian Presbyterians 

Current ministers in the Presbyterian Church of Australia include Allan Harman, David Mitchell, Iain Murray and Bruce W. Winter. Notable former ministers of the PCA include Peter Cameron, who was charged with heresy in 1993 and subsequently excommunicated.

Notable congregations
 Scots' Church, Melbourne
 Scots Church, Sydney
 Chinese Presbyterian Church
 Malvern Presbyterian Church

See also

 Australian Inland Mission
List of Presbyterian and Reformed denominations in Australia
 Presbyterian Church of Victoria
 Presbyterian polity
 Presbyterian Inland Mission

References

External links
Official website of the Presbyterian Church of Australia
The Presbyterian Church of Australia in New South Wales
The Presbyterian Church of Queensland
The Presbyterian Church of Victoria

 
Presbyterian denominations in Australia
Uniting Church in Australia
Christian organizations established in 1901
Christian denominations in Australia
Australia
Presbyterian denominations established in the 20th century
Members of the World Reformed Fellowship